Lamar Lake is a lake in the U.S. state of Washington. The elevation of the lake is 3117 feet.

References

Lakes of Washington (state)
Lakes of Stevens County, Washington